Euschemon is a genus of skipper butterflies in the family Hesperiidae. It is monotypic, being represented by the single species Euschemon rafflesia, commonly known as the regent skipper and is found in Australia.

Taxonomy
It was formerly often included in the tribe Tagiadini of the subfamily of spread-winged skippers, Pyrginae. However, it seems to be the single most distinct living skipper butterfly. Consequently, it is treated as a monotypic subfamily Euschemoninae, as was first proposed by William Forsell Kirby as early as 1897.

Synonyms
The regent skipper, in addition to the systematic uncertainties that have surrounded it for long, is a rather variable species. Consequently, it has been treated under a variety of names, which are nowadays considered junior synonyms. For example:
 Euschemon alba Mabille, [1903]
 Euschemon alboornatus Olliff, 1891
 Euschemon viridis Waterhouse, 1932
 Exometoeca rafflesia (Macleay, [1827])
 Hesperia rafflesia Macleay, [1827]

William Sharp Macleay named the butterfly after Sir Stamford Raffles "to whose scientific ardour and indefatigable exertions in Java and Sumatra, every naturalist must feel himself indebted."

Description

The regent skipper is quite small relative to most butterflies, however, it is large relative to most species in the family Hesperiidae. Its common name refers to the gaudy coloration; mostly black with conspicuous yellow and red dots and bands.

A notable trait of this butterfly are the males' frenulum and retinaculum which  couple the fore- and hindwing together in flight. This structure is presumably plesiomorphic for most or all Macrolepidoptera, but is absent in all known Rhopalocera (butterflies) except the regent skipper and the Hedylidae (moth-butterflies).

References

  (2009): Tree of Life Web Project – Euschemoninae. Version of 2009-JUN-11. Retrieved 2009-DEC-24.

Butterflies of Australia
Hesperiidae
Monotypic butterfly genera
Hesperiidae genera